"1985" is a song that was written and recorded by SR-71 for their album Here We Go Again. Mitch Allan, SR-71's frontman, gave the song to American rock band Bowling for Soup, who recorded a cover version. The cover version reached number 23 on the Billboard Hot 100 and was featured on the band's album A Hangover You Don't Deserve.

The song is about a middle-aged woman who is stuck in the 1980s due to being in denial that her life is zooming by so fast and the fact that she never got to live out her ideal life before settling down and starting a family.

Background
The song was originally written by SR-71 frontman Mitch Allan and drummer John Allen for the band's third album Here We Go Again. The album was initially only made available in Japan.

Bowling for Soup version

There are conflicting stories on how Bowling for Soup came to record a cover version of the track. According to SR-71's website, Bowling for Soup's Jaret Reddick heard the song and asked for permission to record a cover. However, according to Bowling for Soup's website, it was Allan that called Reddick to suggest the possible cover. In a 2010 interview with Songfacts, Reddick said that the cover materialized through the two bands’ association with producer Butch Walker. 

Bowling for Soup made some changes to the lyrics of the original song. In the second verse, the reference to the film Fast Times at Ridgemont High is replaced by St. Elmo's Fire. The line "Never knew George was gay/hoped they'd hook up one day" is changed to "Thought she'd get a hand/on a member of Duran Duran." 

The ending lines "Where's her fairytale? Where's her dream?/Where's the quarterback from her high school football team?/How many times will she ask herself 'What happened to me?'" are changed to "Where's the mini-skirt made of snake skin?/And who's the other guy that's singing in Van Halen?/When did reality become TV?/Whatever happened to sitcoms, game shows? (on the radio?)". Bowling for Soup's lines reference Sammy Hagar joining Van Halen in 1985 and the advent of reality television. The line "(The rubber broke!)" after "'What happened?'" is omitted. 

Bowling for Soup added the line "And when did Ozzy become an actor?" to the bridge, referencing rock singer Ozzy Osbourne's appearance in the reality TV show The Osbournes.

Chart performance 
Released on July 26, 2004, the song climbed to the number 23 spot on the Billboard 200 chart and debuted at number 1 on the Hot Digital Tracks chart, with 15,500 paid downloads.

Music video 
The music video is directed by Smith n' Borin (Ryan Smith and Frank Borin). It takes place on a neighborhood street where the character of Debbie, played by actress Joey House, fixes up the cluttered lawn of her house but gets distracted by Bowling for Soup playing music in their garage across the street. The band parodies the music videos for Robert Palmer's "Addicted to Love" and George Michael's "Faith", as well as the acts Run-DMC and Mötley Crüe. At the end of the video, Debbie walks across the street to the band, lets her hair down, and in a nod to Whitesnake's video for "Here I Go Again", writhes around on top of a car. She continues to do this even after the song ends, until her husband calls out to ask her what she’s doing. Mitch Allan from SR-71 appears in the video as a passersby who gives the band a look of contempt.

Track listings 

UK CD1 and digital download
 "1985" – 3:14
 "Major Denial" – 2:36

UK CD2
 "1985"
 "Bipolar"
 "Major Denial"
 "1985" (video)

UK 7-inch single
A. "1985" – 3:13
B. "Make It Up to You" – 3:52

Digital EP
 "1985" – 3:13
 "Bipolar" – 2:37
 "Major Denial" – 2:22
 "Make It Up to You" – 3:52

Charts

Certifications

Release history

Cover versions and parodies
Christian parody band ApologetiX released a parody titled "None Too Ladylike" on the group's Wordplay album, about Jezebel from the Bible.

The Bowling for Soup version has been covered by Richard Thompson on the live album 1000 Years of Popular Music.

On July 9, 2022, Thomas Ian Nicholas released a parody cover of "1985" titled "1999".

References

External links 
 Cover Without Context by JP Timko

2003 songs
2004 singles
Bowling for Soup songs
Songs written by Mitch Allan
Songs written by Jaret Reddick
List songs
Song recordings produced by Butch Walker
SR-71 (band) songs
Song recordings produced by Mitch Allan
Songs about nostalgia